Heinen's Grocery Store is a family-owned and operated regional supermarket chain in Northeast Ohio and in the Chicago metropolitan area.

History
Heinen's was founded in 1929 in Cleveland, Ohio when Joe Heinen opened a small meat market on Kinsman Road (now called Chagrin Boulevard).  After running the store for a few years, Joe opened his first supermarket across the street from the original butcher shop in 1933.

On August 22, 2012, after two years of market and distribution logistics research, the company opened its first store outside the Greater Cleveland area in The Shops at Flint Creek in Barrington, Illinois, a suburb of Chicago.  At that point, the chain served 18 suburban communities in Ohio and Illinois.

On December 21, 2012, news came that the company had entered into a preliminary agreement with the Village of Glenview, Illinois to build a new Heinen's store on the site of a building formerly occupied by a Dominick's supermarket, which had closed six years earlier in 2006. The Glenview location opened May 7, 2014. In early 2014, Heinen's also agreed to terms on new locations in Lake Bluff, Illinois and Bannockburn, Illinois.

In September 2013, it was announced that the company was in the final stages of negotiation with the Geis Companies for a 15-year lease on space in the Ameritrust Tower and Swetland Building at the corner of East 9th Street and Euclid Avenue in downtown Cleveland. The company was reported to have had a long-standing interest in the downtown area and had come close to a deal for space in a major development on the east bank of the Cuyahoga River just prior to the start of the Great Recession. Company leadership, while acknowledging the risks associated with the deal, was hopeful that the population in the downtown area would continue its recent upward trend and further solidify the new store's customer base. This location, occupying the first two floors of the building and the first floor of the neighboring Swetland Building, opened on February 25, 2015.

Heinen's has 23 stores,  19 in Ohio and four in Illinois.  The stores in Illinois do not sell Yuengling.

References

External links
 
 About - Heinen's Grocery Store
 Heart Center Combining Forces with Heinen's Grocery Store, Cleveland Clinic, October 17, 2005
 Farm-to-plate tracking: Heinen's says idea is old news, Farm and Dairy, September 22, 2005

Supermarkets of the United States
Retail companies established in 1929
Companies based in Cleveland
Family-owned companies of the United States
Retail companies based in Ohio
Privately held companies based in Ohio
1929 establishments in Ohio
Business services companies established in 1929